Jin Sato may refer to:

, Japanese footballer
, stage name of Yuki Sato, Japanese actor